Humphrey Public Schools is a school district that operates a single public school, Humphrey Public School, in Humphrey, Nebraska.

Its board has nine members as of 2017.

References

External links
 Humphrey Public School
School districts in Nebraska
Education in Platte County, Nebraska